In economics, additive utility is a cardinal utility function with the sigma additivity property.

Additivity (also called linearity or modularity) means that "the whole is equal to the sum of its parts." That is, the utility of a set of items is the sum of the utilities of each item separately. Let  be a finite set of items.

It follows that for any ,

An additive utility function is characteristic of independent goods. For example, an apple and a hat are considered independent: the utility a person receives from having an apple is the same whether or not he has a hat, and vice versa. A typical utility function for this case is given at the right.

Notes 
 As mentioned above, additivity is a property of cardinal utility functions. An analogous property of ordinal utility functions is weakly additive.
 A utility function is additive if and only if it is both submodular and supermodular.

See also 
 Utility functions on indivisible goods
 Independent goods
 Submodular set function
 Supermodular set function

References 

Utility function types